Edward Anthony Nolfi (born September 30, 1958, in Warren, Ohio) is an American attorney, editor, teacher, and writer, and the author of numerous legal textbooks published by McGraw-Hill, including the first (and only) comprehensive legal terminology textbook published in the United States, Legal Terminology Explained (2009).

Nolfi is a bachelor's degree, liberal arts graduate of Brown University and a doctorate degree, law graduate of The University of Akron. Admitted to the bar in Ohio, New York, and United States federal courts including the United States Supreme Court, he has been an attorney since 1983. From 1985 to 1987, he was an American Law Reports (ALR) editor with The Lawyers Co-operative Publishing Company. From 1999 to 2006, he was a lead case law editor, product developer, and project manager with LexisNexis. Since 1988, he has taught legal, business, criminal justice, and general education courses at the Academy of Court Reporting (1988–1991), Kent State University (1993), Mount Aloysius College (1996), Remington College (2006–2008), and Butler County Community College (Pennsylvania) (2010).

Publications
 Legal Terminology Explained (2009) , the first (and only) comprehensive legal terminology textbook published in the United States
 Basic Legal Research for Paralegals (2008) 
 Basic Wills, Trusts, and Estates (1995) 
 Ohio Supplement to Accompany Basic Civil Litigation (1993) 
 Basic Legal Research and Writing (1993)  (co-author)
 Basic Legal Research (1993) , the first formal legal research textbook for paralegals published in the United States
 "Extensions of time under Sec. 108(b) of the Bankruptcy Code (11 USCS Sec. 108(b))," 96 A.L.R. Fed 699 (1990) (co-author)
 "State or local regulation of toxic substances as preempted by Toxic Substances Control Act (15 USCS Sec. 2601 et seq.)," 84 A.L.R. Fed 913 (1987)
"When are persons other than owners, directors, officers, and employees potentially liable for penalties under IRC Sec. 6672 (26 USCS Sec. 6672), concerning failure to collect and pay over tax," 84 A.L.R. Fed 170 (1987)
"Copyrightability of sculptural works," 83 A.L.R. Fed 845 (1987)
"Home office tax deductions under 26 USCS Sec. 280A," 83 A.L.R. Fed 691 (1987)
"Extensions of time under Sec. 108(c) of the Bankruptcy Code (11 USCS Sec. 108(c))," 83 A.L.R. Fed 528 (1987)
"Standing to sue for copyright infringement under 17 USCS Sec. 501(b)," 82 A.L.R. Fed 509 (1987)
"Extensions of time under Sec. 108(a) of the Bankruptcy Code (11 USCS Sec. 108(a))," 80 A.L.R. Fed 374 (1986)
"Employee training time as exempt from minimum wage and overtime requirements of Fair Labor Standards Act," 80 A.L.R. Fed 246 (1986)
"State or local regulation of transportation of hazardous materials as pre-empted by Hazardous Materials Transportation Act (49 USCS Sec. 1801 et seq.)," 78 A.L.R. Fed 289 (1986)

References
 Who's Who in America, Who's Who in American Law, and Who's Who in the World published by Marquis Who's Who
 Author biographies published in McGraw-Hill textbooks and online

External links
McGraw-Hill Higher Education web page

1958 births
Living people
American legal writers